Hina Kawre is an Indian politician and a member of the INC. She is the current deputy speaker of Madhya Pradesh Legislative Assembly.

Political career 
She became an MLA for the first time in 2013.
She was among the 58 candidates of INC who won in the assembly election held in 2013 . In 2018, she again won the assembly seat with thumping majority from Lanji (Balaghat) assembly constituency. On 10 January 2019, she was elected as the deputy speaker of the Madhya Pradesh Legislative Assembly.

See also 
 2013 Madhya Pradesh Legislative Assembly election

References

External links 
 

1965 births
Living people
Indian National Congress politicians from Madhya Pradesh
21st-century Indian women politicians
21st-century Indian politicians
Madhya Pradesh MLAs 2013–2018
Women members of the Madhya Pradesh Legislative Assembly